Collège Saint-Michel (German: Kollegium St. Michael) is a  Gymnasium school located in Fribourg, Switzerland.  It was established in 1582 by the Jesuit order as a boys' school.

Personalities

Rectors 
 Pierre Michel (1582–1888)
 Jean-Baptiste Jaccoud (1888–1924)
 Hubert Savoy (1924–1939)
 Romain Pittet (1939–1952)
 Mgr Edouard Cantin (1952–1971)
 Abbé André Bise (1971–1983)
 Michel Corpataux (1983–1989)
 Jean Baeriswyl (1989–1996)
 Nicolas Renevey (1996–2004)
 Jacques de Coulon (2004–2008)
 Matthias Wider (since 2008)

Notable teachers 
 Jean-Pierre Dorand
 Fabrice Hadjadj
 Félicien Morel
 Claude Schorderet
 Denis Clerc
 Michel Bugnon-Mordant

Notable alumni 

 Erich von Däniken, ancient astronaut theorist
 Patrick Aebischer (1954– ), president of the EPFL
 Abbé Joseph Bovet (1879–1951), composer
 Dominique de Buman (1956– ), national councilor
 Jacques Chessex (1934–2009), writer
 Michel Dénériaz (1928–1999), radio host and game show
 Joseph Deiss (1946– ), former federal councilor
 Antoine Dousse (1924–2006), bookseller, teacher and writer
 Claude Frochaux (1935), writer, publisher
 Emile Gardaz (1931–2007), poet and writer
 Félix Glutz, vaudois politician
 François Gross (1931–2015), journalist
 Pierre Hemmer (1950–2013), one of the Internet pioneers in Switzerland
 Armin Jordan (1932–2006) orchestra conductor
 Cardinal Charles Journet (1891–1974)
Anthony Kohlmann (1771–1836), Jesuit educator
 Mgr Pierre Mamie (1920–2008), bishop
 Jules Marmier (1874–1975), Swiss composer, cellist, organist and choirmaster
 Georges Python, conseiller d'État, principal founder in 1891 of the University of Fribourg
 Gaston de Raousset-Boulbon (1817–1854), adventurer, conqueror of the desert of Sonora (Mexico)
 Count Gonzague de Reynold (1880–1970), historian and writer
 Léon Savary (1895–1968), writer and journalist
 Peter Scholl-Latour (1924–2014), journalist
 Vladimir Serbinenko, Switzerland's first gold medallist at the International Mathematical Olympiad
 Father Joseph-Marie Timon-David (1835–1842), founder of Congregation of the Sacred Heart of Jesus
 Ernst Wilczek (1862–1948), botanist

See also
 List of Jesuit schools

References

External links
 

Secondary schools in Switzerland
Jesuit schools in Europe
1852 establishments in Switzerland
Educational institutions established in 1852
Collège Saint-Michel alumni